Car dependency is the concept that some city layouts cause cars to be favoured over alternate forms of transportation, such as bicycles, public transit, and walking.

Overview
In many modern cities, automobiles are convenient and sometimes necessary to move easily.
When it comes to automobile use, there is a spiraling effect where traffic congestion produces the 'demand' for more and bigger roads and removal of 'impediments' to traffic flow. For instance, pedestrians, signalized crossings, traffic lights, cyclists, and various forms of street-based public transit, such as trams.

These measures make automobile use more pleasurable and advantageous at the expense of other modes of transport, so greater traffic volumes are induced. Additionally, the urban design of cities adjusts to the needs of automobiles in terms of movement and space. Buildings are replaced by parking lots. Open-air shopping streets are replaced by enclosed shopping malls. Walk-in banks and fast-food stores are replaced by drive-in versions of themselves that are inconveniently located for pedestrians. Town centers with a mixture of commercial, retail, and entertainment functions are replaced by single-function business parks, 'category-killer' retail boxes, and 'multiplex' entertainment complexes, each surrounded by large tracts of parking.

These kinds of environments require automobiles to access them, thus inducing even more traffic onto the increased road space. This results in congestion, and the cycle above continues. Roads get ever bigger, consuming ever greater tracts of land previously used for housing, manufacturing, and other socially and economically useful purposes. Public transit becomes less viable and socially stigmatized, eventually becoming a minority form of transportation. People's choices and freedoms to live functional lives without the use of the car are greatly reduced. Such cities are automobile-dependent.

Automobile dependency is seen primarily as an issue of environmental sustainability due to the consumption of non-renewable resources and the production of greenhouse gases responsible for global warming. It is also an issue of social and cultural sustainability. Like gated communities, the private automobile produces physical separation between people and reduces the opportunities for unstructured social encounters that is a significant aspect of social capital formation and maintenance in urban environments.

Origins of car dependency 

As automobile use rose drastically in the 1910s, American road administrators favored building roads to accommodate traffic rather than disincentivize the behaviors that lead to it. Administrators and engineers in the interwar period spent their resources making small adjustments to accommodate traffic such as widening lanes and adding parking spaces, as opposed to larger projects that would change the built environment altogether. American cities began to tear out tram systems in the 1920s. Car dependency itself saw its formation around the Second World War, when urban infrastructure began to be built exclusively around the car. The resultant economic and built environment restructuring allowed wide adoption of automobile use. In the United States, the expansive manufacturing infrastructure, increase in consumerism, and the establishment of the Interstate Highway System set forth the conditions for car dependence in communities. In 1956, the Highway Trust Fund was established in America, reinvesting gasoline taxes back into car-based infrastructure.

Urban design factors

Land-use (zoning) 
In 1916 the first zoning ordinance was introduced in New York City, the 1916 Zoning Resolution. Zoning was created as a means of organizing specific land uses in a city so as to avoid potentially harmful adjacencies like heavy manufacturing and residential districts, which were common in large urban areas in the 19th and early 20th centuries. Zoning code also determines the density of housing allowed in certain areas of a city by defining such things as single-family homes, and multi-family residential as being allowed as of right or not in certain areas. The overall effect of zoning in the last century has been to create homogenized zones in cities that had previously been a mix of heterogenous residential and business uses. The problem is particularly severe right outside of cities, in ring suburbs where strict zoning codes almost exclusively allow for single family detached housing. Strict zoning codes that result in a heavily segregated built environment between residential and commercial land uses contributes to car dependency by making it nearly impossible to access all one's given needs, such as housing, work, school and recreation without the use of a car. One key solution to the spatial problems caused by zoning would be a robust public transportation network. There is also currently a movement to amend older zoning ordinances to create more mixed-use zones in cities that combine residential and commercial land uses within the same building or within walking distance to create the so-called 15-minute city.

Parking minimums are also a part of modern zoning codes, and contribute to car dependency through a process known as induced demand. Parking minimums require a certain number of parking spots based on the land use of a building and are often designed in zoning codes to represent the maximum possible need at any given time. This has resulted in cities having nearly eight parking spaces for every car in America, which have created cities almost fully dedicated to parking from free on-street parking to parking lots up to three times the size of the businesses they serve. This prevalence in parking has perpetuated a loss in competition between other forms of transportation such that driving becomes the de facto choice for many people even when alternatives do exist.

Street design 
The design of city roads can contribute significantly to the perceived and actual need to use a car over other modes of transportation in daily life. In the urban context car dependence is induced in greater numbers by design factors that operate in opposite directions - first, design that makes driving easier and second, design that makes all other forms of transportation more difficult. Frequently these two forces overlap in a compounding effect to induce more car dependence in an area that would have potential for a more heterogenous mix of transportation options. These factors include things like the width of roads, that make driving faster and therefore 'easier' while also making a less safe environment for pedestrians or cyclists that share the same road. The prevalence of on-street parking on most residential and commercial also streets makes driving easier while taking away street space that could be used for protected bike lanes, dedicated bus lanes, or other forms of public transportation.

Negative externalities of automobiles 

According to the Handbook on estimation of external costs in the transport sector made by the Delft University, which is the main reference in European Union for assessing the externalities of cars, the main external costs of driving a car are:
 congestion and scarcity costs,
 collision costs,
 air pollution costs,
 noise pollution costs,
 climate change costs,
 costs for nature and landscape,
 costs for water pollution,
 costs for soil pollution and
 costs of energy dependency.

Addressing the issue

There are a number of planning and design approaches to redressing automobile dependency, known variously as New Urbanism, transit-oriented development, and smart growth. Most of these approaches focus on the physical urban design, urban density and landuse zoning of cities. Paul Mees argued that investment in good public transit, centralized management by the public sector and appropriate policy priorities are more significant than issues of urban form and density.

Removal of minimum parking requirements from building codes can alleviate the problems generated by car dependency. Minimum parking requirements occupy valuable space that otherwise can be used for housing. However, removal of minimum parking requirements will require implementation of additional policies to manage the increase in alternative parking methods.

There are, of course, many who argue against a number of the details within any of the complex arguments related to this topic, particularly relationships between urban density and transit viability, or the nature of viable alternatives to automobiles that provide the same degree of flexibility and speed. There is also research into the future of automobility itself in terms of shared usage, size reduction, roadspace management and more sustainable fuel sources.

Car-sharing is one example of a solution to automobile dependency. Research has shown that in the United States, services like Zipcar, have reduced demand by about 500,000 cars. In the developing world, companies like eHi, Carrot, Zazcar and Zoom have replicated or modified Zipcar's business model to improve urban transportation to provide a broader audience with greater access to the benefits of a car and provide "last-mile" connectivity between public transportation and an individual's destination. Car sharing also reduces private vehicle ownership.

Urban sprawl and smart growth

Whether smart growth does or can reduce problems of automobile dependency associated with urban sprawl has been fiercely contested for several decades. The influential study in 1989 by Peter Newman and Jeff Kenworthy compared 32 cities across North America, Australia, Europe and Asia. The study has been criticised for its methodology, but the main finding, that denser cities, particularly in Asia, have lower car use than sprawling cities, particularly in North America, has been largely accepted, but the relationship is clearer at the extremes across continents than it is within countries where conditions are more similar.

Within cities, studies from across many countries (mainly in the developed world) have shown that denser urban areas with greater mixture of land use and better public transport tend to have lower car use than less dense suburban and exurban residential areas. This usually holds true even after controlling for socio-economic factors such as differences in household composition and income.

This does not necessarily imply that suburban sprawl causes high car use, however. One confounding factor, which has been the subject of many studies, is residential self-selection: people who prefer to drive tend to move towards low-density suburbs, whereas people who prefer to walk, cycle or use transit tend to move towards higher density urban areas, better served by public transport.  Some studies have found that, when self-selection is controlled for, the built environment has no significant effect on travel behaviour. More recent studies using more sophisticated methodologies have generally rejected these findings: density, land use and public transport accessibility can influence travel behaviour, although social and economic factors, particularly household income, usually exert a stronger influence.

The paradox of intensification
Reviewing the evidence on urban intensification, smart growth and their effects on automobile use, Melia et al. (2011) found support for the arguments of both supporters and opponents of smart growth. Planning policies that increase population densities in urban areas do tend to reduce car use, but the effect is a weak one, so doubling the population density of a particular area will not halve the frequency or distance of car use.

These findings led them to propose the paradox of intensification:

All other things being equal, urban intensification which increases population density will reduce per capita car use, with benefits to the global environment, but will also increase concentrations of motor traffic, worsening the local environment in those locations where it occurs.

At the citywide level, it may be possible, through a range of positive measures to counteract the increases in traffic and congestion that would otherwise result from increasing population densities: Freiburg im Breisgau in Germany is one example of a city which has been more successful in reducing automobile dependency and constraining increases in traffic despite substantial increases in population density.

This study also reviewed evidence on local effects of building at higher densities.  At the level of the neighbourhood or individual development, positive measures (like improvements to public transport) will usually be insufficient to counteract the traffic effect of increasing population density.

This leaves policy-makers with four choices:

 intensify and accept the local consequences
 sprawl and accept the wider consequences
 a compromise with some element of both
 or intensify accompanied by more direct measures such as parking restrictions, closing roads to traffic and carfree zones.

See also 

Accessibility (transport)
 Automotive city
 Car costs
 Car-free movement
 Cycling infrastructure
 Effects of the car on societies
 
 Forced rider
 Jevons paradox
 

 Peak car
 Sedentary lifestyle
 Sustainable transport
 Transit-oriented development
 Transport divide
 Urban planning
 Walkability

Notes and references

Bibliography 
 Mees, P (2000) A Very Public Solution:transport in the dispersed city, Carlton South, Vic. : Melbourne University Press   
 Geels, F., Kemp, R., Dudley, G., Lyons, G. (2012) Automobility in Transition? A Socio-Technical Analysis of Sustainable Transport. Oxford: Routledge.

External links 
 Automobile Dependency (TDM Encyclopedia), Victoria Transport Policy Institute
  Smart Cities concept cars at MIT

Urban design
Sustainable urban planning
Sustainable transport